Texas is a state in the South Central region of the United States. The region's second-quarter 2018 gross state product was 8.6% of the GDP of the country at $1.755 trillion, with significant growth in mining, quarrying, and oil and gas extraction. The state ranked third on Forbes list of Best States For Business in 2018, noting strong growth, employment and income and a primary target for corporate relocations over the last six years.

Largest firms 
This list shows firms in the Fortune 500, which ranks firms by total revenues reported before January 31, 2018. Only the top five firms (if available) are included as a sample.

Notable firms 
This list includes notable companies with primary headquarters located in the state. The industry and sector follow the Industry Classification Benchmark taxonomy. Organizations which have ceased operations are included and noted as defunct.

See also
 List of companies in Dallas
 List of companies in the Dallas–Fort Worth metroplex
 List of companies in Houston

References 

Texas